Dionysios Bairaktaris (1927 – July 17, 2011) was the Greek Orthodox metropolitan bishop of Chios, Psara, and Oinousses, Greece.

Notes

Bishops of the Church of Greece
1927 births
2011 deaths
Greek Orthodox bishops of Chios